Borne is a hamlet in the Dutch province of North Brabant. It is located in the municipality of Meierijstad, just to the west of the centre of the town of Schijndel.

References

Populated places in North Brabant
Meierijstad